Saung Oo Hlaing (born 8 December 1971) is a Burmese singer-songwriter. He is one of the few Burmese successful songwriters that do not rely on writing cover songs. In a 2008 interview, he claimed that he had not written a cover song since 2003, and that 95% of 400 plus songs he had written were of his own creation.

Saung Oo Hlaing is a medical doctor by profession; he has a MBBS degree from the University of Medicine 1, Yangon.  

In the aftermath of the 2021 Myanmar coup d'état, Saung Oo Hlaing was stripped of his citizenship for left the country illegally in violation of the country's existing laws, had acted in a way that harmed the interests of Myanmar.

References

20th-century Burmese male singers
21st-century Burmese male singers
Burmese singer-songwriters
Burmese pop singers
1971 births
Living people
People from Yangon
Burmese people of Indian descent
University of Medicine 1, Yangon alumni
Burmese physicians